I Saw Mommy Kissing Santa Claus is a 2001 made-for-TV family film, based on the classic holiday song of the same name. The movie's tagline was "Christmas is coming, and Santa's a dirty rat."  

The film was directed by Craig Clyde, who had a cameo appearance as Major Titanium, and stars Corbin Bernsen and Connie Selleca. I Saw Mommy Kissing Santa Claus first aired December 9, 2001, on the PAX Network where it aired until 2007. As of 2008, it is shown in the 25 Days of Christmas programming block on Freeform.

The film is one of Sellecca's final performances before her retirement from acting. She didn't act again until The Wild Stallion in 2009.

Plot
Young Justin Carver (Dylan and Cole Sprouse) is having Thanksgiving dinner with his family, only for it to end with the news that his best friend Bobby's (Eric Jacobs) bickering parents are finally deciding to divorce. When he overhears his own parents, Stephanie and David Carver (Connie Sellecca and Corbin Bernsen) having a heated argument, Justin retreats to his bedroom. A few minutes later, Justin peeks downstairs, only to see his mother Stephanie locked in a warm, romantic embrace with none other than Santa Claus (his father in a Santa suit). He takes a photo, shows it to Bobby the next day, and then sends it to Mrs. Claus. Fooled by Bobby's own situation with his parents, Justin jumps to the conclusion that his mother is having an affair with Santa. So he decides to behave as badly as possible in an attempt to prevent Santa from coming to his house on Christmas Eve night for him to make off with Justin's mother. The resulting hi-jinks include Justin setting traps and throwing snowballs at a street Santa, and even getting himself in trouble at school. Then, on Christmas Eve, Justin's mother receives a letter from the post office. Inside is the photo, which didn't get sent. In the end, Justin finds out that Santa was his father, apologizes to the street Santa and gets the toy he wanted from the real Santa.

Cast
 Dylan and Cole Sprouse as Justin Carver
 Eric Jacobs as Bobby Becker
 Connie Sellecca as Stephanie Carver
 Corbin Bernsen as David Carver
 Sonny Carl Davis as Santa/Floyd
 Tony Larimer as Grandpa Irwin
 David Millbern as Felix Becker
 Shauna Thompson as Marie Becker
 Joan Mullaney as Ms. Crumley
 JJ Neward as Jaine
 Paul Kierman as Sal Jenkins
 Caitlin EJ Meyer as Mary Poindexter (as Caitlin Meyer)
 Jeff Olson as Principal Hoke
 Frank Gerrish as Sidney

Reception
Andy Webb from "The Movie Scene" gave the film two out of five stars and stated: "What this all boils down to is that "I Saw Mommy Kissing Santa Claus" is a misguided movie. It's misguided because the fact it basically debunks Santa Clause means it doesn't have a target audience and those who are young enough to find the jokes funny are the ones who don't need the magic of Christmas spoilt." Justin Oberholtzer from "Freakin' Awesome Network" gave it a D+ and wrote: "It baffles me that it took four men to write this script. How hard is it to knock out such a simple premise? Maybe they were all friends and simply started exchanging ideas for the Santa chases. Those pranks are the only thought put into the film and they become redundant. They try to instill some heart into the film, but it comes off like a cheesy Hallmark card. Which is the best way to describe this film."

See also
 List of Christmas films

References

External links 
 

2001 comedy films
2001 television films
2001 films
American Christmas comedy films
Films based on songs
2000s Christmas comedy films
Christmas television films
2000s English-language films
2000s American films
Santa Claus in film